Oum Drou is a town and commune in Chlef Province, Algeria. The 1998 census recorded it as having a population of 17,314.

References

Communes of Chlef Province
Cities in Algeria
Algeria